The Gentle Crackdown (Traditional Chinese: 秀才遇著兵) is a TVB costume comedy series broadcast in May 2005.

An indirect sequel, The Gentle Crackdown II (秀才愛上兵) was produced and broadcast in 2008 continued with only Wayne Lai, alongside Steven Ma, Yumiko Cheng, and Ha Yu.

Synopsis
What would happen when a slow-paced scholar meets an impetuous constable?  During the Ming Dynasty, the world is full of corrupt officials.  Master Constable Luk Chin (Yuen Wah) fell in love with the female outlaw Fei Ying (Michelle Yim) and they have a daughter - Luk Sap-Yee (Niki Chow).

Hoping to follow in her father's footsteps, Sap-Yee is an impulsive and idealistic constable whose skill and competence is often dismissed by her corrupt male peers.  Meanwhile, her mother has given up her old ways and keeps her old identity and martial arts skills a secret to watch over her troublesome daughter.  When Sui Tong-Lau (Moses Chan), the newly appointed magistrate, arrives in Sap-Yee's city, they wind up working together to solve a number of unusual cases.

Cast

Meaning of title

External links
TVB.com The Gentle Crackdown - Official Website 
Butterfly's Place.net The Gentle Crackdown - Episodic Synopsis 
YouTube.com The Gentle Crackdown - Theme Song Video

TVB dramas
2005 Hong Kong television series debuts
2005 Hong Kong television series endings